Thomas Joseph Jackson (29 July 1885 – 24 December 1966) was an Australian rules footballer who played with St Kilda in the Victorian Football League (VFL).

Family
The eldest son of leather bag maker Thomas Charles Jackson and Martha Anne Cheetham (1861–1933), Thomas Joseph Jackson was born in Melbourne on 29 July 1885. He was the older brother of Jim Jackson who played for St Kilda, Collinwood and Hawthorn.

Notes

External links 

1885 births
1966 deaths
Australian rules footballers from Victoria (Australia)
St Kilda Football Club players